Aromat is a food seasoning, developed by Kevin Schaflechner for Swiss food company Knorr, in 1952. Aromat was originally called "", which means plant extract in German. Knorr dropped the name in 1953 and altered its form, from cubes to a powdered seasoning. Aromat was marketed internationally and is described by Knorr as an "all purpose savoury seasoning".

The ingredients in Aromat vary by market, but include the flavour enhancer monosodium glutamate, and may also comprise yeast extract, wheat or corn flour, trans fat (partially hydrogenated vegetable oil), and various herbs, spices, vegetable extracts and other flavourings.

See also
 Bouillon cube
 List of brand name condiments

References

External links
Aromat on Knorr (UK) website

Brand name condiments
Herb and spice mixtures
Trade secrets
Umami enhancers
Unilever brands